Maldon (locally ) is a town and civil parish on the Blackwater estuary in Essex, England.  It is the seat of the Maldon District and starting point of the Chelmer and Blackwater Navigation. It is known for Maldon Sea Salt which is produced in the area.

History

Early and medieval history
The place-name Maldon is first attested in 913 in the Anglo-Saxon Chronicle, where it appears as Maeldun. Maldon's name comes from mǣl meaning 'monument or cross' and dūn meaning 'hill', so translates as 'monument hill'. East Saxons settled the area in the 5th century and the area to the south is still known as the Dengie Peninsula after the Dæningas. It became a significant Saxon port with a hythe or quayside and artisan quarters. Evidence of imported pottery from this period has been found in archaeological digs. From 958 there was a royal mint issuing coins for the late Anglo-Saxon and early Norman kings.

It was one of the only two towns in Essex (Colchester was the other), and King Edward the Elder is thought to have lived here while combating the Danish settlers who had overrun North Essex and parts of East Anglia. A Viking raid was beaten off in 924, but in another raid in 991 the defenders were defeated in the Battle of Maldon and the Vikings received tribute but apparently did not attempt to sack the town. It became the subject of the celebrated Old English poem "The Battle of Maldon". The battle is commemorated by a window in St Mary's Church and by a statue on the quayside of the slain Saxon warrior Byrhtnoth.

According to the Domesday Book there were 54 households and an estimated 180 townsmen in 1086. The town still had the mint and supplied a warhorse and warship for the king's service in return for its privileges of self-government. The town was awarded a charter by Henry II in 1171, stating the rights of the town as well as defining its borders and detailing its duty to provide a ship for the monarch "when necessary". The town's All Saints' Church, unique in England in having a triangular tower, dates from around this period. While the precise building date is unknown, the church existed by 1180, the date of the foundation of nearby Beeleigh Abbey. A Charter of Richard I of December 1189 confirms "certain grants to Beeleigh Abbey, including the Church of Blessed Peter in Maldon and the Church of All Saints' in the same town". St Mary's Church, on the Hythe Quay has a grade I listed Norman nave from 1130, though evidence exists of an earlier church on the site from at least a hundred years before. Meanwhile, Maldon Moot Hall dates back to around 1420.

Renaissance and modern eras
There were strong urban traditions, with two members elected to the Commons and three guilds which hosted lavish religious plays until they were suppressed by Puritans in 1576. Then, until 1630, professional actors were invited to perform plays, which were also stopped by Puritans. From 1570 to about 1800 a rival tradition of inviting prominent clergy to visit the town also existed. In 1629 a series of grain riots took place, led by the wife of a local butcher.

In the 17th century Thomas Plume started the Plume Library to house over 8,000 books and pamphlets printed between 1487 and his death in 1704; the collection has been added to at various times since 1704. The Plume Library is to be found at St Peter's Church. Only the original tower survives, the rest of the building having been rebuilt by Thomas Plume to house his library (on the first floor) and what was Maldon Grammar School (on the ground floor).

In the church of All Saints is a memorial window to George Washington, whose great-great grandfather, Lawrence Washington, is buried here. Unveiled by an American diplomat on 5 July 1928, the window displays Saint Nicholas with the Mayflower, Saint George and Saint Joan of Arc in the centre. At the top are the arms of the Washington family, and the arms of the USA, England, Scotland and Wales. At the bottom are depictions of George Washington, the landing of the Mayflower, the signing of the Declaration of Independence and the Statue of Liberty.

Also in Maldon are Maldon Baptist Church in Butt Lane, Maldon Methodist Church in the High Street, and Maldon United Reformed Church on Market Hill. Maldon Mosque is in Church Street.

During World War II, Maldon was featured in the German invasion plan for Britain, Operation Sea Lion. The plan called for the Germans to advance to a line between Maldon and the River Severn after they had landed in the southern coast of England.

Geography and geology

Maldon is a town of circa 15,000 people on the tidal River Chelmer by the Blackwater Estuary in Essex.

Essex is a county built on London Clay, overlain with pockets of gravel deposited by riparian action; the lowest land is made up of river alluvium and salt marsh. At Maldon, the railway cutting (now a road cutting) provided a reference section for geologists. There are three landslips on the north-facing river cliff of the Blackwater at Maldon. The middle slip is called the West Maldon Landslip, which was caused by repeated rotational slips of the bedrock London Clay, which is trying to reach a stable angle.

Hythe Quay at the confluence of the Chelmer and Blackwater, which flanks the northern edge of the town, was an important port and Cooks Yard remains significant for Thames barges. The River Blackwater, that was diverted into the Chelmer and Blackwater Navigation, re-emerges into the Blackwater Estuary, through locks at the Heybridge Basin, the stream bed passes down Heybridge Creek. Here it delineates the border between Maldon Town and Heybridge Parish Council.

Transport

Rail

Maldon was previously served by two railway lines. Today, the nearest railway stations to Maldon are Hatfield Peverel, Witham and North Fambridge. Hatfield Peverel is the closest railway station to the north of the town, whilst North Fambridge is closest to southern parts of the town.

Maldon's first railway link was a branch line to Witham opened in 1846. Later, a second line linked Maldon with Woodham Ferrers on the Crouch Valley line between Southminster and Wickford. Whilst Wickford is itself on the line between Shenfield and Southend (thus providing Maldon with another route into London Liverpool Street), a short-lived spur line at Wickford also gave direct access towards Southend.

Edward Arthur Fitch, writing in about 1895, states that from London's Liverpool Street station to Maldon East via Witham there were eight trains on weekdays and three on Sundays and that, via Wickford, there were five trains on weekdays and none on Sundays. The fastest train took 85 minutes via Witham and 82 minutes via Wickford.

Maldon West railway station was opened in 1889 by the Great Eastern Railway. The line between Maldon and South Woodham Ferrers closed to passengers in 1939, the Maldon and Witham line closed in 1966.

Bus
First Essex operates regular bus services into Maldon, including the 31 from Chelmsford, the 75 from Colchester and the 90 from Witham.

Industry
Maldon Sea Salt has been produced in the town since 1882 by the Maldon Crystal Salt Company; it is also the location of the first Tesco store to be designated as a "supermarket" in the country, established in 1958.

Maldon's Hythe Quay is the residence of a number of Thames sailing barges, these are among the last cargo vessels in the world still operating under sail, albeit now used in the spheres of education and leisure. Some ten to fifteen of the surviving fleet count Maldon as their home port, and many others are regular visitors alongside at the Quay. An annual sailing barge race ends with a parade of sail and prize-giving at the quay. Cooks Yard, where barges were once built, is still working at the end of Maldon Quay.

Culture
The town holds the charitable Maldon mud race where competitors race across the Blackwater estuary at low tide, along the bank and back through the water. The race generated over £55,000 for charities in 2014. Maldon also hosts the international Maldon Festival, which takes place each year in late June and July.

The town holds an annual "Taxi Day" which sees mentally and physically disabled children from London driven to Maldon in London Black Cabs for a fun day of activities and a meal. The event dates back to 1952 when a London cab driver visited the Elizabeth Fry Special School (formerly Grange Road Special School) in Plaistow. He wanted to do something special for the young patients he saw there. He wrote to every one of Essex's seaside towns to arrange an outing and the only town that was willing to help was Maldon; thus, Taxi Day has remained a tradition ever since.

Maldon is twinned with the Dutch town of Cuijk. The charter between the two towns was signed in 1970 to cement the relationship.

Cultural references
Maldon and the surrounding area are the setting for a series of books by the prolific author S. L. Bensusan. Bensusan's stories recall a lost way of life among the towns and villages in the area, and along the local coastline and marshland. In Bensusan's books, Maldon is called Market Waldron.

Maldon has been the setting for numerous television productions, including Lawless Heart (2001) starring Bill Nighy, and BBC1's The Murder Game (2003) where numerous Blackwater Estuary locations were used including Green's Flour Mill at the bottom of Market Hill and Steeple Marshes. An episode of the TV series Lovejoy featuring Ian McShane was also filmed there.

In H. G. Wells' The War of the Worlds (1898); Maldon is the town from which the narrator's brother and two female companions manage to escape across the channel.

Maldon is a location mentioned in the "Rose Garden", a short ghost story by M. R. James, and published in More Ghost Stories (1911).

Maldon and its clock tower are featured in the young adult novel Timekeeper by Tara Sim (2016).

Sport
Maldon has a non-League football club Maldon & Tiptree F.C. who play at the Wallace Binder Ground.

There are many developed youth football teams in Maldon, among them being Maldon Saints. The town has a vibrant cricket club, with several adult and colts' sides, who play at two grounds: The Promenade Park, Maldon and the main ground at Drapers Farm, Heybridge. Recent improvements to the ground include a dual-lane enclosed all-weather net facility. Overseas players from Australia, South Africa and Sri Lanka have coached cricket in local primary schools as part of the "ECB Chance to Shine" programme. Drapers Farm is also the home of Maldon Rugby Union Football Club which was founded in 1947 by Tommy Harries, who was the landlord of the King's Head public house in Maldon High Street. The inaugural meeting was on 28 August 1947 at the Blue Boar Hotel. Maldon RFC run several senior male sides and one female side as well as all youth age groups from under 7s to under 18s.

Blackwater Leisure Centre is the town's main leisure destination, located in the town's leisure quarter, adjacent to Madison Heights. With a 4 lane 25m swimming pool, 100+ station gym, group cycling studio, group exercise studio and sports hall with indoor courts. 

Two short lived greyhound racing tracks existed at Sealey Farm on the Fambridge Road (opening on 3 September 1932 and closing the same year) and around the former Spital Road football ground in 1931. The racing was independent (not affiliated to the sports governing body the National Greyhound Racing Club) and they were known as a flapping tracks, which was the nickname given to independent tracks.

Notable people
Essex and England cricketer Sir Alastair Cook (born 1984) played for Maldon Cricket Club throughout his early years. Brought up in nearby Wickham Bishops, his brothers played for the club as well. Cook remains closely associated with the club, being an Honorary Life Member, while acting as a huge role model for the club's young players. Cook made his Essex debut in 2003, before making his international debut, aged 21, in 2006.

Singer/songwriter and TikTok star Sam Ryder, born 1989, represented the UK in the 2022 Eurovision Song Contest with his song "Space Man", where he came 2nd with 466 points.

Private David Embleton (1853–1912) won a Victoria Cross, in his army name of Frederick Corbett, in the Arabi Pasha Rebellion in Egypt on 5 August 1882. He was buried in an unmarked grave in London Road Cemetery, Maldon, but in 2004 the regimental association provided a memorial and in 2005 the Essex Society for Family History provided another. He served in the King's Royal Rifle Corps. Although awarded the VC for standing by a wounded officer, he subsequently forfeited his VC after committing theft against another officer in 1884.

His coat could encompass seven men. After his death, etchings of a painting of him were much sought after. His chair resides in Maldon Moot Hall.

John Cook (1918–1984) was a prolific 20th century Anglo-American composer, organist and church musician.

John Kemp (1926–1987). John Kemp's work on the preservation of Thames sailing barges in the 1960s was critical to re-establishing Maldon as the foremost sailing barge port in the country. John Kemp was responsible for the creation of the East Coast Sail Trust, a schoolship scheme for young people using the sailing barges Thalatta and Sir Alan Herbert, operated from Maldon. He was author of three books and chronicler of the Maldon and Essex coastal scenes and the unique character of the marshland folk, especially in the Maldon and Burnham Standard, Essex Chronicle and Essex County Standard newspapers.

Myra Sadd Brown (1872–1938), Suffragette, women's rights activist and internationalist was born in the town.

John Strutt (1842–1919) was a British mathematician who made extensive contributions to science. He was born in Langford Grove, Maldon, inherited the title Baron Rayleigh in 1873 and won the Nobel Prize in Physics in 1904, in part for discovering the inert gas argon.

Horatio Gates (1727–1806), the English general who fought for Britain in the French and Indian War and the rebel side in the War of American Independence, was born in Maldon.

Ethan Lawrence (born 28 September 1992) is an English actor, born in Maldon. He is known for playing the roles of Joe Poulter in the BBC series Bad Education and James in the Netflix black comedy series After Life.

Virginia Crosbie (born 8 December 1966) is a MP for Ynys Mon was born in Maldon before attending school in Colchester

Twin towns 

  Villeparisis, Île-de-France, France
  Cuijk, North Brabant, Netherlands

Gallery

Nearby places

 Beeleigh Abbey
 Brightlingsea
 Burnham-on-Crouch
 Chelmsford
 Danbury
 Great Totham
 Hazeleigh
 Heybridge
 Langford
 Little Totham
 Maylandsea
 Mundon
 North Fambridge
 South Woodham Ferrers
 Steeple
 Tiptree
 Tollesbury
 Tolleshunt Major
 Tolleshunt Knights
 Tillingham
 Cold Norton
 Witham
 Woodham Mortimer
 Woodham Walter

See also

 Cooks Yard – barge building and repair yard on the River Chelmer at Maldon
 Plume School – secondary school in Maldon

References

External links

 Visit Maldon
 Maldon District Council

 
Towns in Essex
Civil parishes in Essex
Maldon District
Populated coastal places in Essex